Kfar Yavetz (lit. Yavetz Village) is a religious moshav in central Israel. Located in the Sharon plain near Tayibe, it falls under the jurisdiction of Lev HaSharon Regional Council.

History
The village was founded on 10 April 1932 as a kibbutz. It was named for Rabbi Ze'ev Yavetz, a founder of the Mizrachi movement.

As the kibbutz was situated on the front, opposite the Iraqi army sent as auxiliaries during the 1948 Arab-Israeli War, the inhabitants were evacuated for their safety, and the kibbutz was turned into army base. The residents resettled in Geulei Teiman and the village was rebuilt as a moshav in 1951, incorporating within it new immigrants from Yemen and from central Europe.

Kfar Yavetz is located in the heart of the Triangle, near the Wadi Ara highway.

On 7 July 2003, Mazal Afari, 65, a resident of Kfar Yavetz was killed in her home in a suicide bombing carried out  by the Islamic Jihad. Afari, a mother of eight, was waiting for her husband and sons to return from synagogue. The militant slipped into the house unnoticed and detonated a bomb he was carrying in a bag. Three of her grandchildren were injured in the attack. The house was destroyed in the blast.

References

Moshavim
Former kibbutzim
Religious Israeli communities
Populated places established in 1932
Populated places in Central District (Israel)
1932 establishments in Mandatory Palestine